Streets... is an album by British folk musician Ralph McTell.  It was McTell's most successful album, entering the UK album chart on 15 February 1975 and remaining there for twelve weeks.  It opens with McTell's hit single, "Streets of London".

Track listing
All titles by Ralph McTell except * Traditional; arranged by Ralph McTell.

Side One
"Streets of London" - 4:24
"You Make Me Feel Good" - 3:20
"Grande Affaire" - 3:40
"Seeds of Heaven" - 3:15
"El Progresso" - 3:37

Side Two
"Red Apple Juice" * - 4:20
"Heron Song" - 3:30
"Pity the Boy" - 3:35
"Interest on the Loan" - 3:13
"Jenny Taylor/Je N'Étais Là" - 3:40
"Lunar Lullaby" - 3:20

Charts

Personnel
Ralph McTell - guitars, piano, accordion, harmonica, marimba, vocals
Pete  Berryman - lead guitars, rhythm guitar
Jerry Donahue - lead guitar
Mike Piggott - guitar, fiddle, violin
Rod Clements - bass
Dave Pegg - bass
Danny Thompson - double bass
Rabbit Bundrick - piano
Rod Edwards - piano
Danny Lane - drums, percussion
Bob Kerr - saxophone, horns
Sandy Spencer - cello
Alan "Madswitcher" Harris - Jew's harp
Andrew Cronshaw - zither
Prelude - backing vocals (as The Goldrushers)
Maddy Prior - soprano vocals on "Lunar Lullaby"
Graham Preskett - strings arrangement

Production credits
Producer: Ralph McTell
Executive producer: Bruce May
Engineers: Richard Dodd, Stephen Allen, Pete Swettenham and Ralph McTell
Sleeve design: Graves Aslett
Cover photography: Roy Cuthbert

Awards and accolades
"Streets..." reached number 13 in the UK Album Chart in February, 1975.
"Streets..." was awarded a Silver disc for record sales in May, 1975.

Release history

Track variations

The UK 1995 CD release includes two bonus tracks:
 "Country Boys" (McTell) - from the original "Streets..." recording sessions
 "Another Star Ascending (The Boxer)" (McTell) - recorded in 1976.

The German 1999 CD release has one bonus track:
"Summer Lightning" (McTell) - from the album "Easy" and the B-side of the "Streets of London" single.

References

Ralph McTell albums
1975 albums
Warner Records albums